The 2006 WNBA season was the 10th for the San Antonio Silver Stars. It was their 4th season in San Antonio. The Silver Stars failed to qualify for the fourth consecutive season. This was the last season San Antonio had failed to make the playoffs.

Offseason
The Chicago Sky selected Bernadette Ngoyisa from San Antonio in the Expansion Draft.

WNBA Draft

Regular season

Season standings

Season schedule

Player stats

References

External links
Silver Stars on Basketball Reference

San Antonio Stars seasons
San Antonio